Rose Obigah is a Ugandan politician and member of the parliament. She was elected in office as a woman Member to represent Terego district during the 2021 Uganda general elections.

She is a member of the ruling National Resistance Movement party.

See also 
 List of members of the eleventh Parliament of Uganda
Torego District
National Resistance Movement
Parliament of Uganda.
Member of Parliament.

References

External links 

 Website of the Parliament of Uganda.

Members of the Parliament of Uganda
Women members of the Parliament of Uganda
Living people
21st-century Ugandan women politicians
21st-century Ugandan politicians
Year of birth missing (living people)